The End of the World is a 2013 South Korean television series starring Yoon Je-moon, Jang Kyung-ah and Jang Hyun-sung. Based on the 2010 novel Infectious Disease by Bae Young-ik, it aired on JTBC from March 16 to May 5, 2013.

Synopsis
As a virus with a 100% fatality rate spreads in Seoul, Kang Joo-hun (Yoon Je-moon) and other investigators from the Korea Centers for Disease Control and Prevention try to find a cure.

Cast

Main
 Yoon Je-moon as Kang Joo-hun
 Jang Kyung-ah as Lee Na-hyun
 Jang Hyun-sung as Yoon Gyu-jin

Supporting
 Kim Chang-wan as Choi Soo-chul
 Park Hyuk-kwon as Kim Hee-sang
 Gil Hae-yeon as Jung Sang-sook
 Lee Hwa-ryong as Park Do-kyung
 Song Sam-dong as Kim Dae-ik
 Kim Yong-min as Eo Gi-young
 Ye Soo-jung as Na-hyun's mother
 Park In-young as Kim Soo-jin
 Heo Jung-do as Lee Sung-wook
 Jun Suk-chan as Oh Jung-soo
 Yoon Bok-in as Park Joo-hee
 Jang Yong-cheol as Son Byung-shik
 Park Seo-yeon as Soo-jung
 Kim Jong-tae as Boo San-hae

Production
The series was originally scheduled to air for 20 episodes but, due to the low ratings, JTBC announced on April 11, 2013 that The End of the World would be shortened by 8 episodes (bringing the total number of episodes to 12). The time slot was also changed: from April 14 to the last broadcast, only one episode was aired a week instead of the usual two.

Ratings
In this table,  represent the lowest ratings and  represent the highest ratings.

References

External links
  
 
 

JTBC television dramas
Korean-language television shows
2013 South Korean television series debuts
2013 South Korean television series endings
Disaster television series
Television series about viral outbreaks
Television shows set in Seoul
Television shows based on South Korean novels
Television series by Drama House